Events from the year 1855 in Sweden

Incumbents
 Monarch – Oscar I

Events
 1 January - The Telegraphynet between the most important cities in Sweden are completed. 
 1 July - The first Swedish Postage stamp.
 4 May - Kyrkoplikt as well as all remaining forms of Public humiliation and Corporal punishments are abolished. 
 - The Great Awakening established in Sweden.
 - Inauguration of the Gothenburg Synagogue.
 - Lea Ahlborn is appointed royal printmaker, which formally makes her the first female civil servant in Sweden.  
 - Frederique Hammarstedt takes over the Hammarstedtska skolan.
 - KFUM Jönköping
 - Klosterskolan (Uppsala), the first training college for female teachers, is founded.
 - Svenska lärarinnors pensionsförening (The Society for Retired Female Teachers) is founded by initiative of Josefina Deland.
 - A reform abolishes the use of Pillory and the Pranger, by then already in practice outdated and seldom used.

Births

 25 April – Hjalmar Lundbohm, geologist and chemist (died 1926)
 10 June - Hilma Angered Strandberg, writer (died 1927)
 19 November - Anna Branting, journalist and writer  (died 1950)
 23 September - Ellen Fries, writer   (died 1900)
 7 December - Gunhild Rosén, ballerina and ballet master (died 1928)

Deaths
 25 January – Carolina Brunström, ballerina (born 1803)
 15 February - Emilia Uggla, pianist  (born 1819) 
 7 May – Wendela Gustafva Sparre, textile artist and a member of the Royal Swedish Academy of Arts (born 1772)
 27 August – Hans Olov Holmström, bishop  (born 1784) 
 - Marie Antoinette Petersén, violinist (born 1771)

References

 
Years of the 19th century in Sweden
Sweden